Thomas Welsh Watson (21 March 1932 – 18 August 2001) was a Scottish-born stage, television and film actor.

Early life 

Watson was born on 21 March 1932 at Auchinleck, Ayrshire, Scotland. His family later moved to Cambuslang, Lanarkshire, and he studied at the Hamilton Academy, where he excelled in amateur dramatics.

Career 

Following National Service with the Royal Scots, Watson joined the Rutherglen Repertory, a semi-professional theatre company. In 1956 he joined the Byre Theatre in St Andrews, Scotland, before moving on to Perth Repertory Theatre. There he met his future wife, the actress Joyce Bain.

Television 

By 1960 Watson had moved to London and was appearing regularly in BBC radio repertory. In 1964 he was cast in the BBC television production of Martin Chuzzlewit.

During his long career Watson appeared in numerous television series, including Dixon of Dock Green, Dr Finlay's Casebook, Taggart, Prime Suspect, Hamish Macbeth, Heartbeat (British TV series), The Main Chance,  Two Thousand Acres of Sky, Inspector Rebus and Peak Practice. In  Your Cheatin' Heart by John Byrne (Scottish playwright) he played six different parts.

Following his return to Scotland in 1970 Watson worked regularly for the BBC and Granada Television, including appearances as Mobilis in Cedric Messina's production of The Physicist and the Miller in The Canterbury Tales for the BBC, for which he also appeared in such series and dramas as The Standard, Hunting Tower, The Camerons, The Nightmare Man, A Wholly Healthy Glasgow and Govan Ghost Story.

From 1994 to 1996 Watson played the consultant surgeon Mr Ernest Docherty in the BBC series Cardiac Arrest (TV series). He was portrayed as the voice of reason against a management intent on alienating the nursing and clinical staff.

Stage 

Watson's stage appearances included The Catch at the Royal Court Theatre Upstairs in London, Tom Stoppard's Every Good Boy Deserves Favour and, as Stanley Evening, Bugler Boy for the Traverse Theatre in Edinburgh. At the Edinburgh Festival he appeared in 1970 in Middleton's The Changeling (play), directed by Richard Eyre, Sir David Lindsay's Ane Satire of the Thrie Estates (1984), and A Wholly Healthy Glasgow, directed by Richard Wilson, in 1987. Watson’s theatre credits continued with appearances in Sam Shepard's Fool for Love (play) at the Royal National Theatre and in the West End of London,  In Time of Strife at the Glasgow Citizens Theatre, Macbeth and Hamlet at the Royal Lyceum Theatre, Edinburgh, Born Yesterday at the Royal Exchange, Manchester, Bill Bryden's The Ship at Glasgow Docklands in 1990), The Treatment and Some Voices  at the Royal Court Theatre,  The Government Inspector at the Almeida Theatre, Islington, in 1997 and 1998,and Victoria for the Royal Shakespeare Company in 2000.

Films 

Watson’s film work included Silent Scream, The Big Man (1990) and Alan Rickman's The Winter Guest.

Poems 

Watson also produced a volume of poems, Dark Whistle, published in 1997.

Death 
Watson died on 18 August 2001 at St Andrew's Memorial Hospital in St Andrews, Fife.

References

External links 
 Television guide and credits, Tom Watson

1932 births
2001 deaths
People educated at Hamilton Academy
Scottish male stage actors
Scottish male film actors
Scottish male television actors
20th-century Scottish male actors
People from East Ayrshire
People from Cambuslang
Royal Scots soldiers